The Wedge is a spot located at the extreme southeast end of the Balboa Peninsula in Newport Beach, California known for its large waves that makes it a popular spot for surfing and bodysurfing. The Wedge is located at the intersection of the beach and the man-made jetty that forms the breakwater on the western side of Newport harbor entrance.

The waves

The waves are a by-product of alterations to the rock jetty on the west side of the Newport Harbor entrance undertaken during the 1930s. When conditions are right, and a wave approaches the shore at the proper angle (most generally a south swell), an approaching wave will reflect off the jetty creating a second wave.  The reflected wave meets up with the following wave of the set and forms a peak, and this pattern can repeat for several following waves as well.  If the reflected and incoming waves align the resulting wave is bigger than either alone due to constructive interference. This occurs very rapidly and forms waves in a very unpredictable and "unstable" pattern, so that no two waves are alike and the exact breaking point is difficult to predict even for an experienced surfer.

Although this condition primarily occurs with large, south swells, it can also occur, with considerably lesser frequency, during "normal" conditions.

In addition, the beach at the Wedge is very steeply shaped sand, resulting in what is known as shore break and a very strong backwash which often drags people back into the surf. The backwash itself frequently creates another, outgoing wave, which can hit an incoming wave or surfer with enormous force. With the combined effect of the unpredictability of where the incoming waves will break, and the strength of the backwash, the resulting wave action can be highly unpredictable and therefore both exciting as well as very dangerous. The combination of danger, along with the chance to get pitted (enclosed in the tube, barrel, or "pit" of a wave), draws many to surf the Wedge.

The Wedge breaks largest when intense Southern Hemisphere storms or large tropical cyclones send their long period energy from the south-southwest direction, primarily during the summer and fall months.

History 

The formation of the surfing spot known as the Wedge was a by-product of alterations to the Newport Harbor, which were completed and re-dedicated on May 23, 1936.  Before those renovations and extensions of the West Jetty wall, the Newport Harbor was the premier surfing spot on the entire west coast of North America. However, while the Newport Harbor was popular with surfers, it was also at that time a tragic place to be for boaters and swimmers alike, especially during big swells.

In 1926, George Rogers Jr., a 15-year-old with polio, drowned in the Newport Harbor as his boat capsized amidst the heavy waves. As a result of polio, George Rogers Jr. was reliant on leg braces, and due to the weight of his heavy iron leg braces, his body sank to the bottom of the harbor and was never found. To prevent such a tragedy from happening again to boaters or swimmers, the boy's father, George Rogers Sr., a successful southern California road builder, was motivated to sell his business and focus his remaining years of life on seeking local and federal funding to alter the Newport Harbor. From 1926 to 1936 George Rogers Sr. campaigned to raise funds. Despite the scarcity of money during the Depression, Rogers Sr., helped raise approximately $2 million in federal aid and local bond funds.

A month following the re-dedication of the improved Newport Harbor entrance, George Rogers Sr. had a heart attack while on his boat as he entered the harbor entrance. He died at approximately the same location his son died, ten years earlier. In 2014 the documentary, The Wedge: Dynasty, Tragedy, Legacy, aired on PBS SoCaL, recounting these events.

Popular culture 
In the early to mid-1950s The Wedge was known locally as "102 Beach," where teens held frequent evening beach parties at which Brew 102, a popular (and inexpensive) Southern California beer from the Maier Brewing Co. was liberally consumed. The Wedge makes an appearance in Bruce Brown's The Endless Summer. Balboa is mentioned in the opening song to seminal 1963 surfing movie "Beach Party".

Legendary surf music guitarist Dick Dale memorialized the Wedge in an eponymous song on the 1963 album, Checkered Flag.  Pop punk band All Time Low also mentions the Wedge in their song "Let It Roll" from their 2007 album, "So Wrong, It's Right".

John Wayne attended USC in the 1920s, where he played on the Trojans football team. "While still playing football, Wayne went to the Wedge for a bodysurfing session and wound up — as so many others do — getting injured at the famously fast and heavy spot. Because he could no longer play football, he lost his athletic scholarship. And without funds, he had to drop out of USC. After leaving school, Wayne went to work at the studios, beginning with a summer gig in a prop department."

Gallery

Further reading

References

External links 

The Wedge: Dynasty, Tragedy, Legacy (Full Video: 25:36)
The Thrill-Seeking Bodysurfers of California's Most Terrifying Wave
Surf report for the Wedge

Surfing locations in California
Geography of Orange County, California
Balboa Peninsula
Big wave surfing
Beaches of Orange County, California
Beaches of Southern California
Articles containing video clips
1936 establishments in California